British Honduras competed at the 1962 British Empire and Commonwealth Games in Perth, Western Australia, from 22 November to 1 December 1962. This was the first time that the nation competed at the games. The British Honduras Olympic and Commonwealth Games Association sent two athletes, both of whom competed in athletics.

Athletics

Men
Track events

Field events

Key
Note–Ranks given for track events are within the athlete's heat only
N/A = Round not applicable for the event

References

Belize at the Commonwealth Games
Nations at the 1962 British Empire and Commonwealth Games
British Empire and Commonwealth Games